WEAF (1130 AM) is an Urban contemporary gospel formatted radio station in Camden, South Carolina, United States. The station is owned by Jeff Andrulonis. Much of the programming is featured from the Rejoice! Musical Soul Food satellite feed.

On November 8, 2016 WEAF was granted a Federal Communications Commission construction permit to move to 1120 kHz from a new transmitter site, change the community of license to Saint Stephen, decrease day power to 390 watts and eliminate night operation.

History
At one time, this station had the letters WAME and an adult standards format. Then-owners GHB Broadcasting switched the format to Sports Talk and changed the callsign to WQIS.

In 2006, Glory Communications Inc. purchased WEAF from Colonial Radio Group Inc., and the format was Urban contemporary gospel.

From 1922 to 1946, WEAF was the callsign of the radio station that became WNBC and the flagship station of the NBC Red network.  This station is now known as WFAN (AM) in New York. In the mid-1970s, WEAF was the callsign of the current WPTI in Eden, North Carolina.

Ownership
Colonial Radio Group acquired then-WQIS in 2003.  In April 2006, Glory Communications Inc. (Alex Snipe, president) reached an agreement to purchase WEAF from Colonial Radio Group Inc. (Jeffrey Andrulonis, president) for a reported sale price of $222,500.

References

External links
 

Kershaw County, South Carolina
Gospel radio stations in the United States
EAF